Ammonium tetrafluoroborate (or ammonium fluoroborate) is an inorganic salt composed of the ammonium cation and the tetrafluoroborate anion, with the chemical formula NH4BF4. When heated to decomposition, ammonium tetrafluoroborate releases toxic fumes of hydrogen fluoride, nitrogen oxides, and ammonia.

Preparation
Ammonium tetrafluoroborate can be prepared by reacting ammonium fluoride with boric acid and sulfuric acid:

8 NH4F + 2 H3BO3 + 3 H2SO4 → 2 NH4BF4 + 3 (NH4)2SO4 + 6 H2O

References

Ammonium compounds
Tetrafluoroborates